Kelishad va Sudarjan, meaning Kelishad and Sudarjan, is a town in the Central District of Falavarjan County, Isfahan Province, Iran. In the 2006 census, its population was 23,203 (6,371 families).

As the name implies, the city is an amalgam of two earlier settlements: Kelishad (also Romanized as Kelīshād, Kalūshād, and Gulshād; also known as Kelīshād-e Soflá, Kelīshād-e Vasūderjān, and Bābā ‘Abdollāh) and Sudarjan (Persian: سودرجان, also Romanized as Sūdarjān and Sūdjān).

For its public transit system, The city is served by Falavarjan County Municipalities Mass Transit Organization bus network route 3.

References

External links

Populated places in Falavarjan County

Cities in Isfahan Province